The Continental Volleyball Conference is an intercollegiate men's volleyball conference associated with the NCAA's Division III.

History
On April 4, 2011 Gary Williams, Associate Athletic Director of Carthage College announced in Milwaukee the formation of the Continental Volleyball Conference. The league was established as a direct result of the launch of the NCAA Men's Division III Volleyball Championship in the next school year of 2011–12, with the inaugural tournament to take place in April 2012.

With the continued growth of Division III men's volleyball, the CVC announced in March 2014 that it would split into two leagues after the 2014 season. The league's six Eastern members retained the CVC name and branding, while the six Midwestern members, plus two other Midwestern schools that had been announced as incoming CVC members, formed a new men's volleyball conference that was later unveiled as the Midwest Collegiate Volleyball League (MCVL). When the split was announced, the eastern members also added Rutgers–Newark, a Division III school which had previously played at the National Collegiate (Division I/II) level as a "grandfathered" scholarship-granting program, for the 2015 season.

The conference added the newly launched men's volleyball program of Alvernia as its eighth member for the 2017 season.

Further membership changes were announced in 2016. First, on October 12, the Middle Atlantic Conferences, whose Commonwealth Conference was the all-sports home of charter CVC member Stevenson and new CVC member Alvernia, announced that its Middle Atlantic Conference would begin sponsoring men's volleyball in the 2018 season, leading to the departure of those schools from the CVC. Within a week of this development, the CVC announced that Kean, Neumann, and Southern Virginia would 
become new members for the 2018 season, and that Thiel would leave after that same season. Then, on November 21, Ramapo was announced as an incoming member for the 2018 season.

Thiel did not initially announce its future men's volleyball affiliation, but would eventually be revealed as a new affiliate member of the Allegheny Mountain Collegiate Conference effective with the 2018–19 school year.

While Thiel left after the 2018 season, the CVC added three new members for the 2019 season, all of which launched new varsity programs at that time. First, in October 2017, Randolph–Macon College was announced as an incoming member. Then, in December of that year, the CVC announced that Elizabethtown College and Immaculata University would also join.

On July 1, 2018 the New Jersey Athletic Conference announced they would add men's volleyball as a sponsored sport. Kean and Rutgers–Newark maintain dual membership in the CVC and NJAC starting in 2018–19. Ramapo College left the CVC and returned to the Skyline Conference; Rampo maintains dual affiliation for men's volleyball in the NJAC and Skyline.

Inaugural member, Cairn departed the conference for the 2019–20 academic year after the university's all-sport conference, the Colonial States Athletic Conference, announced the addition of men's volleyball as a conference sport.

Member schools

Current members
The league currently has 10 full members.

Note that because NCAA men's volleyball is a spring sport, the year of joining is the calendar year before the first season of competition.

Former members
School names and nicknames reflect those in use during the final season each school was a CVC member.

In addition to the above schools, two other institutions that were adding men's volleyball for the 2014–15 school year (2015 season)—Benedictine University in Illinois and Loras College in Iowa—had been announced as new CVC members. They never officially joined the CVC, instead uniting with the six Midwestern CVC schools in the MCVL. (Benedictine left once its all-sports home of the Northern Athletics Collegiate Conference began sponsoring men's volleyball in 2017–18, while Loras left the MCVL in 2019 for single-sport membership in the College Conference of Illinois and Wisconsin, which added men's volleyball for 2019–20 and beyond.)

Membership timeline
As noted previously, the year of joining is the calendar year before the first season of competition.

Conference Tournament Champions

 *Cancelled due to the coronavirus pandemic

League titles by school

Notes

References

NCAA Division III conferences